John Warhurst (born 1 October 1944 in Sheffield, West Riding of Yorkshire) is a retired male race walker from England.

Athletics career
As an amateur Warhurst won the 1967 Sheffield Star Walk.  Warhurst represented Great Britain at the 1972 Olympic Games, finishing 18th in the 50 km walk. He represented England and won a gold medal in the 20 miles walk event, at the 1974 British Commonwealth Games in Christchurch, New Zealand.

International competitions

References

1944 births
Living people
Sportspeople from Sheffield
English male racewalkers
British male racewalkers
Olympic athletes of Great Britain
Athletes (track and field) at the 1972 Summer Olympics
Commonwealth Games gold medallists for England
Commonwealth Games medallists in athletics
Athletes (track and field) at the 1974 British Commonwealth Games
Medallists at the 1974 British Commonwealth Games